Ust-Kosa (Uś Kösva) is a rural locality (a settlement) in Svetlichanskoye Rural Settlement, Kosinsky District, Perm Krai, Russia. The population was 137 as of 2010. There are 3 streets.

Geography 
Ust-Kosa is located 99 km northeast of Kosa (the district's administrative centre) by road. Novaya Svetlitsa is the nearest rural locality.

References 

Rural localities in Kosinsky District